Sandra Kay Yotz (born March 25, 1963) is an American former soccer player who played as a defender, making seven appearances for the United States women's national team.

Career
Gordon did not play collegiate soccer due to few opportunities in the 1980s. She played club soccer for the Tacoma Cozars of Tacoma, Washington, which participated in the USASA National Women's Amateur. She was later selected to participate at the U.S. Olympic Festival in Raleigh, North Carolina in 1987.

Noticed by Anson Dorrance, Gordon was invited in 1987 to train in the U.S. national team camp in Blaine, Minnesota. She made her international debut for the United States on July 9, 1987 in the 1987 North America Cup against Sweden. With her appearance, she became the first black player to be capped to the U.S. women's national team. In total, she made seven appearances for the U.S., earning her final cap on July 29, 1988 in a friendly match against France.

Personal life
Gordon was born in Pierce County, Washington to Marianne and Albert Curtis Gordon. She attended Clover Park High School in Lakewood, Washington, where she participated in track and field.

Career statistics

International

References

1963 births
Living people
People from Pierce County, Washington
Soccer players from Washington (state)
American women's soccer players
African-American women's soccer players
United States women's international soccer players
Women's association football defenders
21st-century African-American people
20th-century African-American sportspeople
20th-century African-American women
20th-century African-American people
21st-century African-American women